Dhanora, commonly known as "Dhanora Motya" is a village located in Purna taluka of Parbhani district, in the state of Maharashtra, India.

Demographics
As per 2011 census:
Dhanora Motya has 625 families residing. The village has population of 2927.
Out of the population of 2827, 1473 are males while 1454 are females. 
Literacy rate of the village is 72.55%.
Average sex ratio of the village is 987 females to 1000 males. Average sex ratio of Maharashtra state is 929.

Location

References

Villages in Parbhani district